The Anacostia Railroad Bridge is a vertical lift railroad bridge crossing the Anacostia River in Washington, D.C., United States. The bridge is owned by CSX Transportation.

History
The Baltimore and Potomac Rail Road, a subsidiary of the Pennsylvania Railroad, built the first railroad bridge on this site, which opened on July 2, 1872. Successor Penn Central Railroad rebuilt the bridge in 1972.

The bridge currently carries freight trains.  It is near the point where the RF&P Subdivision becomes the Landover Subdivision, with a connection to the Alexandria Extension just to the east of the bridge. Originally the bridge supported three tracks. This was later reduced to two tracks, and then one track in 2006.

Operations
The lift span is occasionally raised for boat traffic. The lift is controlled by a CSX bridge tender located nearby at Benning Rail Yard.

Incidents
On November 10, 2007, a unit train carrying coal derailed and caused the collapse of the northern span of the bridge.

CSX had briefly closed the bridge in 2006 after it found high levels of corrosion and made repairs, and after the 2007 accident it again closed the bridge. The southern span was reopened 24 hours after the accident.

See also
 Amtrak Railroad Anacostia Bridge
 Landover Subdivision

References

Railway bridges in Washington, D.C.
Bridges over the Anacostia River
CSX Transportation bridges
Bridges completed in 1872
Vertical lift bridges in the United States
Metal bridges in the United States
1872 establishments in Washington, D.C.